Persiaran Kerjaya, or Jalan Glemarie, Federal Route 3213, is a major highway in Klang Valley, Selangor, Malaysia. It is a toll-free highway and act as alternative route to Federal Highway.

The Kilometre Zero is located at Jalan Subang-Batu Tiga junction near Shah Alam.

At most sections, the Federal Route 3213 was built under the JKR R5 road standard, allowing maximum speed limit of up to 90 km/h.

References

Malaysian Federal Roads
Highways in Malaysia
Expressways and highways in the Klang Valley